The Assets is an eight-part American drama television miniseries that aired on ABC in 2014. The series was based on the book Circle of Treason: A CIA Account of Traitor Aldrich Ames and the Men He Betrayed by retired CIA officers Sandra Grimes and Jeanne Vertefeuille. The series was executively produced by Morgan Hertzan, Rudy Bednar and Andrew Chapman. The pilot episode earned a 0.7 rating in the 18-to-49-year-old demographic, making The Assets the lowest rated drama premiere ever on one of the big three networks.

On January 10, 2014, ABC canceled The Assets due to low ratings. ABC Entertainment Group President Paul Lee disclosed at the Television Critics Association press tour that the unaired episodes would be made available at some point in the future. On June 21, 2014, the remaining episodes began airing on Saturdays, but after just two further broadcasts, ABC again pulled the series. The final four episodes aired in a Sunday afternoon timeslot in late July and early August, 2014. All eight episodes of The Assets were then made available on Netflix on September 1, 2014.

The Assets received mixed reviews from critics. Metacritic awarded the series a "mixed or average" score of 58 out of 100, based on reviews by fifteen critics. On Rotten Tomatoes, the series holds a 56% rating with an average rating of 5.6 out of 10, based on 16 reviews. More than four years after its initial broadcast, the series was picked up by Alibi for broadcast in the United Kingdom, with broadcast set for Summer 2018, ahead of Jodie Whittaker's debut as The Doctor in Doctor Who.

Cast
 Jodie Whittaker as Sandra Grimes
 Paul Rhys as Aldrich Ames
 Harriet Walter as Jeanne Vertefeuille
 Ralph Brown as Wallace Austin
 Stuart Milligan as Arthur O'Neill
 Christina Cole as Louisa Tilton
 Catalina Denis as Rosario Ames
 Lex Shrapnel as Mitch Weaver
 Julian Ovenden as Gary Grimes
 Goran Kowtow as Victor Cherkashin
 John Lynch as Vitaly Yurchenko
 Amelia Clarkson as Kelly Grimes
 Akie Kotabe as Eric D'Amaro

Episodes

References

External links

Fiction set in 1985
2010s American drama television series
2014 American television series debuts
2014 American television series endings
American Broadcasting Company original programming
Television series about the Cold War
English-language television shows
Espionage television series
Television shows based on books
Television series based on actual events
Television series set in 1985
Television shows set in Washington, D.C.
Television series by Disney–ABC Domestic Television